"Spectre of Love" is the title of The Stranglers song released in September 2006. It was released as a single on CD and bright green-colored vinyl on 11 September that year. The song is also the second track of the band's album, Suite XVI, which released a week later. Vocals are provided by Baz Warne.

The back side of the CD single is a live acoustic version of "Instead of This", while the vinyl featured a live version of "Death & Night & Blood".

References

The Stranglers songs
2006 singles
2006 songs
Liberty Records singles
Songs written by Jet Black
Songs written by Jean-Jacques Burnel
Songs written by Dave Greenfield